Charles William Gibson (7 April 1889 – 22 March 1977) was a British Labour Party politician.

At the 1945 general election, he was returned as Member of Parliament for Kennington.  When that constituency was abolished for the 1950 general election, he was elected for the Clapham constituency.  He held that seat until the 1959 election, when he was defeated by the Conservative candidate Alan Glyn.
OutLine of his Political Career
Member Independent Labour Party & Labour Party (1909–1964)
Member of the Lambeth Borough Council (1918–1931)
Member of Parliament for Kennington (1945–1949)
Member of Parliament for Clapham (1949–1959)
Member of London County Council (1928–1964), representing Vauxhall
Treasurer of the Trade union group of Labour MPs (1951–1964)
Member of the Estimates Committee of the House of Commons (1958–1964)
Vice-Chair of LCC Housing Committee (1934–1939)
Chair of LCC Housing Committee (1943–1950)
Justice of the Peace (1944–1964)

References
Notes

List

External links 
 

Labour Party (UK) MPs for English constituencies
1889 births
1977 deaths
Transport and General Workers' Union-sponsored MPs
UK MPs 1945–1950
UK MPs 1950–1951
UK MPs 1951–1955
UK MPs 1955–1959
Members of London County Council